Luka Rotković (Serbian Cyrillic: Лука Ротковић; born 5 July 1988) is a Montenegrin footballer who plays as a forward. He last played for Bangladesh Premier League side Bangladesh Police FC.

Club career
In February 2015, Rotković signed a one-year contract with FC Okzhetpes of the Kazakhstan Premier League, with the option of an additional second year.

On 3 March 2016, Rotković signed a one-year deal with Dinamo Minsk.

In January 2017, Rotković signed a three-year contract with a newly formed K League 2 side Ansan Greeners.

In October 2019, he joined the Bangladesh Premier League side Chittagong Abahani for the 2019 Sheikh Kamal International Club Cup. He scored three goals in the tournament, including a goal in the final, where his team ended up as runners-up. He left the club after the tournament.

In November 2019, he joined Bangladesh Police FC, a newly promoted team of the Bangladesh Premier League for the 2019–20 season.

Career statistics

References

External links

1988 births
Living people
Footballers from Podgorica
Association football forwards
Montenegrin footballers
OFK Petrovac players
FK Budućnost Podgorica players
OFK Titograd players
FK Mornar players
Maccabi Petah Tikva F.C. players
FC Okzhetpes players
FC Dinamo Minsk players
Ansan Greeners FC players
FC Luch Minsk (2012) players
Montenegrin First League players
Israeli Premier League players
Kazakhstan Premier League players
Belarusian Premier League players
K League 2 players
Bangladesh Premier League players
Montenegrin expatriate footballers
Expatriate footballers in Israel
Montenegrin expatriate sportspeople in Israel
Expatriate footballers in Kazakhstan
Montenegrin expatriate sportspeople in Kazakhstan
Expatriate footballers in Belarus
Montenegrin expatriate sportspeople in Belarus
Expatriate footballers in South Korea
Montenegrin expatriate sportspeople in South Korea
Expatriate footballers in Bangladesh
Bangladesh Police FC players